Nāzo Tokhī (نازو توخۍ), commonly known as Nāzo Anā ("Nazo the grandmother"), was an Afghan poetess and a writer in the Pashto language. Mother of the famous early-18th century Afghan king Mirwais Hotak, she grew up in an influential family in the Kandahar region. She is remembered as a brave woman warrior in Afghan history and as the "Mother of the Afghan Nation".

Early life and family background
Nazo Tokhi was born into a powerful and wealthy Pashtun family in the village of Spozhmayiz Gul, near Thazi, in the Kandahar Province of Afghanistan, in or about the year 1651. Her father, Sultan Malakhai Tokhi, was a prominent head of the Tokhi Pashtun tribe and governor of the Ghazni region. She was married to Salim Khan Hotak, son of Karam Khan. The famous Afghan ruler of the Hotak dynasty, Mirwais Hotak, was her son, and Mahmud Hotak and Hussain Hotak were her grandsons.

Nazo Ana became a learned poetess and courteous person; people knew her by her loving and caring nature. Nazo's father had paid close attention to her education and upbringing, inducing learned men in Kandahar to educate her fully. She came to be regarded as the "Mother of the Afghan Nation", gaining respect through her poetry and her strong support for the Pashtunwali code. Nazo called for Pashtunwali to be made the law of the confederacy of Pashtun tribes, and she arbitrated conflicts between the Ghilji and Sadozai tribes so as to encourage their alliance against the foreign Persian Safavid rulers. Her poetic contributions to Afghan culture are highly regarded even today.

When their father was killed in battle near Sur mountain, Nazo's brother went into battle to avenge him and left Nazo in charge of household and fortress. She put on a sword and alongside the men defended the fortress against the enemy.

Poetry
This is a translated excerpt from Nazo Tokhi's poetry (in the original Pashto, one of the two thousand or so couplets which she composed):

Legendary dream
Legend holds that Nazo Ana had an extraordinary dream on the night her son Mirwais Hotak was born.

Death
Nazo Ana died in or about 1717 at the age of about 66, two years after her son Mirwais's death. After her death, her cause was taken up by Zarghuna Ana, the mother of Afghan Emir Ahmad Shah Durrani.

Legacy
Nazo Ana is revered as a heroine among the Afghans. Various Afghan schools and other institutions are named after her.

See also

Tokhi
Malalai of Maiwand
Hotak dynasty
Pashto literature and poetry

References

External links
Nazo Ana Primary School in Afghanistan
Nazo Ana High School for girls in Kandahar, Afghanistan
Nazo Ana Clinic in Kabul, Afghanistan
 Nazo tokhi relationship website

1651 births
1717 deaths
17th-century Afghan people
18th-century Afghan people
17th-century poets
18th-century poets
17th-century women writers
18th-century women writers
Women in 17th-century warfare
Women in 18th-century warfare
18th-century Afghan poets
Pashtun women
Pashto-language poets
Afghan women poets
Women in war in South Asia
Hotak dynasty